Sutherland's Law is a television series made by BBC Scotland between 1973 and 1976.

The series had originated as a stand-alone edition of the portmanteau programme Drama Playhouse in 1972 in which Derek Francis played Sutherland and was then commissioned as an ongoing series. The producer was Frank Cox.

Sutherland's Law dealt with the duties of the Procurator Fiscal in a small Scottish town. The major cast members included Iain Cuthbertson (as John Sutherland), Gareth Thomas, Moultrie Kelsall, Victor Carin, Martin Cochrane, Don McKillop, Maev Alexander and Edith MacArthur.

Directors included Douglas Camfield who directed episode 2 of series 2 "Caesar's Wife" transmitted on 22 May 1974

The exteriors for the series were filmed in Oban, Argyll.

The signature tune was The Land of the Mountain and the Flood, by Hamish MacCunn. Series creator Lindsay Galloway released a novel based on the series in 1974.

The DVD of selected episodes from Sutherland's Law Series 1 was released on Region 2 by Acorn Media UK in the UK on 1 June 2009.

References

External links
 
 Action TV episode guide

BBC television dramas
1970s British crime television series
1970s British drama television series
1970s British legal television series
1973 Scottish television series debuts
1976 Scottish television series endings
BBC Scotland television shows
Scots law
1970s in Scotland
English-language television shows
1970s Scottish television series